Kate Stoltzfus (born September 21, 1991), known professionally as Kate Stoltz, is an American model, designer, and television personality based in New York City. She was one of the five stars of the reality show Breaking Amish and has appeared on one of the show sequels Breaking Amish: Brave New World.

Early life and education
Stoltz was born Katie Stoltzfus on September 21, 1991, in Myerstown, Pennsylvania, on a  farm to an Amish family. Kate Stoltz was the middle child in a family of seven children, and spent her days working on the farm and sewing clothing for herself and her immediate family. Stoltz received her associate degree in Fashion Design from the Fashion Institute of Technology.

Career

Television
Stoltz starred in Breaking Amish, a reality television show on the TLC network. She appeared in the first two seasons and participated in the first three seasons of the follow-up show Return to Amish, which premiered on June 1, 2014.

Modeling
Stoltz moved to New York City to pursue a career in modeling. She worked for Union Bay, Spiegal, Bella, and Gypsy Sisters. She posed for Maxim magazine in July 2013.

Kate Stoltz label
She began her own fashion line in 2015, called the Kate Stoltz label. The label focuses on made to measure luxury women's wear. She won the 2014 Demiurge Award for her work as an emerging designer in New York City.

Volunteerism
Stoltz is a spokesperson for the nonprofit organization Developing Faces, a mission that visits Guatemala annually to assist Guatemalans with facial abnormalities. Stoltz also volunteers at Food Bank and MCC.

References

External links

1991 births
American Amish people
American female models
Artists from Lancaster, Pennsylvania
Living people
American fashion designers
American women fashion designers
Participants in American reality television series
Female models from Pennsylvania
People from Lebanon County, Pennsylvania